Alexandru Buligan (born 22 April 1960) is a retired Romanian handball goalkeeper who played a record of 280 international games for Romania. He won bronze medals at the 1984 Summer Olympics and the 1990 World Championships.

At the club level he played in Romania until 1990 and in Spain from 1990 to 2002. After that he worked as a goalkeeper coach and assistant for the Spain men's national handball team, winning with them the 2005 World Men's Handball Championship.

Honours
Player
Romanian League: 1982
Romanian Cup: 1986, 1988
Spanish League: 2002
Spanish Cup: 1999, 2001
Spanish Supercup: 2002
EHF Cup Winners' Cup: 2000
EHF Supercup: 2000
EHF Champions League: 2001
Individual
World Championship Best Goalkeeper: 1990
Liga ASOBAL Goalkeeper of the Year: 1991, 1997, 1998, 2000

References

External links 
 
 
 

1960 births
Living people
Romanian male handball players
People from Drobeta-Turnu Severin
SDC San Antonio players
Liga ASOBAL players
CSA Steaua București (handball) players
CS Dinamo București (men's handball) players
Handball players at the 1984 Summer Olympics
Handball players at the 1992 Summer Olympics
Olympic handball players of Romania
Romanian expatriate sportspeople in Spain
Romanian handball coaches
Olympic bronze medalists for Romania
Olympic medalists in handball
Medalists at the 1984 Summer Olympics